San Pablo is a district of the León Cortés Castro canton, in the San José province of Costa Rica.

Geography 
San Pablo has an area of  km² and an elevation of  metres.

Locations 
 Barrios (neighborhoods): Estadio, La Clara, La Virgen, Los Ángeles, Sagrada Familia
 Poblados (villages): Abejonal, Carrizales, Los Navarro, Montes de Oro, Rosario

Demographics 

For the 2011 census, San Pablo had a population of  inhabitants.

Transportation

Road transportation 
The district is covered by the following road routes:
 National Route 226
 National Route 313

References 

Districts of San José Province
Populated places in San José Province